The 1982 NHL Entry Draft was the 20th NHL Entry Draft. It was held at the Montreal Forum in Montreal, Quebec. The National Hockey League (NHL) teams selected 252 players eligible for entry into professional ranks, in the reverse order of the 1981–82 NHL season and playoff standings. This is the list of those players selected.

The last active player in the NHL from this draft class was Dave Andreychuk, who retired after the 2005–06 season.

Selections by round
Below are listed the selections in the 1982 NHL Entry Draft. Club teams are located in North America unless otherwise noted.

Round one

 The New Jersey Devils' first-round pick went to the Boston Bruins as the result of a trade on July 21, 1981 that sent the rights to Dwight Foster and Boston's tenth-round pick in 1982 NHL Entry Draft to Colorado in exchange for Boston's option to swap first-round picks in 1982 NHL Entry Draft (this pick) and a second-round pick in 1982 NHL Entry Draft.  The Colorado Rockies relocated to New Jersey to become the Devils for the 1982-83 NHL season.
 The Detroit Red Wings' first-round pick went to the Minnesota North Stars as the result of a trade on August 21, 1981 that sent Greg Smith, rights to Don Murdoch and Minnesota's first-round pick in 1982 NHL Entry Draft to Detroit in exchange for this pick.
 The Hartford Whalers' first-round pick went to the Philadelphia Flyers as the result of a trade on July 3, 1981 that sent Don Gillen, Rick MacLeish, Fred Arthur, Philadelphia's first-round, second-round and third-round in 1982 NHL Entry Draft to Hartford in exchange for Ray Allison, Fred Arthur, Hartford's third-round in 1982 NHL Entry Draft and this pick.
 The Los Angeles Kings' first-round pick went to the Buffalo Sabres as the result of a trade on March 10, 1980 that sent Jerry Korab to Los Angeles in exchange for this pick.
 The St. Louis Blues' first-round pick went to the New Jersey Devils as the result of a trade on June 9, 1982 that sent Rob Rammage to St. Louis in exchange for St. Louis' first-round pick in 1983 NHL Entry Draft and this pick. 
 The Calgary Flames' first-round pick went to the Buffalo Sabres as the result of a trade on June 8, 1982 that sent Richie Dunn, Don Edwards and Buffalo's second-round pick in 1982 NHL Entry Draft to Calgary in exchange for Calgary's second-round pick in 1982 NHL Entry Draft, second-round pick in 1983 NHL Entry Draft, Buffalo's option to swap first-round picks in 1983 NHL Entry Draft and this pick. 
 The Philadelphia Flyers' first-round pick went to the Hartford Whalers as the result of a trade on July 3, 1981 that sent Ray Allison, Fred Arthur, Hartford's first-round and third-round in 1982 NHL Entry Draft to Philadelphia in exchange for Don Gillen, Rick MacLeish, Fred Arthur, Philadelphia's second-round and third-round in 1982 NHL Entry Draft with this pick.
 The Minnesota North Stars' first-round pick went to the Detroit Red Wings as the result of a trade on August 21, 1981 that sent Detroit's first-round pick in 1982 NHL Entry Draft in exchange for Greg Smith, rights to Don Murdoch and this pick.
 The Boston Bruins' first-round pick went to the New Jersey Devils as the result of a trade on July 21, 1981 that sent Colorado's second-round pick in 1982 NHL Entry Draft and Boston's option to swap first-round picks in 1982 NHL Entry Draft to Boston in exchange for the rights to Dwight Foster and Boston's tenth-round pick in 1982 NHL Entry Draft.  The Colorado Rockies relocated to New Jersey to become the Devils for the 1982-83 NHL season.

Round two

 The New Jersey Devils' second-round pick went to the Boston Bruins as the result of a trade on July 21, 1981 that sent the rights to Dwight Foster and Boston's tenth-round pick in 1982 NHL Entry Draft to Colorado in exchange for Boston's option to swap first-round picks in 1982 NHL Entry Draft and this pick.  The Colorado Rockies relocated to New Jersey to become the Devils for the 1982-83 NHL season.
 The Philadelphia Flyers' second-round pick went to the Toronto Maple Leafs as the result of a trade on January 20, 1982 that sent Darryl Sittler to Philadelphia in exchange for Rich Costello, future considerations (Ken Strong) and this pick.
 Philadelphia previously acquired this pick as the result of a trade on November 21, 1980 that sent Norm Barnes and Jack McIlhargey to Hartford in exchange for this pick.
 The Washington Capitals' second-round pick went to the Buffalo Sabres as the result of a trade on June 9, 1982 that sent Alan Haworth and Buffalo's third-round pick in 1982 NHL Entry Draft to Washington in exchange for Washington's fourth-round picks in 1982 NHL Entry Draft and this pick. 
 The Minnesota North Stars' second-round pick went to the Calgary Flames as the result of a trade on June 7, 1982 that sent Willi Plett and Calgary's fourth-round pick in 1982 NHL Entry Draft to Minnesota in exchange for Steve Christoff, Bill Nyrop and this pick.
 Minnesota previously acquired this pick as the result of a trade on June 10, 1979 that sent Richie Hansen and Bryan Maxwell to St. Louis in exchange for this pick.
 The Pittsburgh Penguins' second-round pick went to the Montreal Canadiens as the result of a trade on August 30, 1979 that sent Robert Holland and Pat Hughes to Pittsburgh in exchange for Denis Herron and this pick.
 The Calgary Flames' second-round pick went to the Buffalo Sabres as the result of a trade on June 8, 1982 that sent Richie Dunn, Don Edwards and Buffalo's second-round pick in 1982 NHL Entry Draft to Calgary in exchange for Calgary's first-round pick in 1982 NHL Entry Draft, second-round pick in 1983 NHL Entry Draft, Buffalo's option to swap first-round picks in 1983 NHL Entry Draft and this pick. 
 The Minnesota North Stars' second-round pick went to the Montreal Canadiens as the result of a trade on August 8, 1979 that sent Bill Nyrop to Minnesota in exchange for Minnesota's second-round pick in 1979 NHL Entry Draft and second-round pick in 1980 NHL Entry Draft.  The trade was later changed for this pick on June 11, 1980 (1980 NHL Entry Draft day.
 Minnesota previously acquired this pick as the result of a trade on January 4, 1980 that sent Kris Manery to Vancouver in exchange for this pick.
 The Winnipeg Jets' second-round pick went to the Montreal Canadiens as the result of a trade on September 26, 1980 that sent Norm Dupont to Winnipeg in exchange for this pick.
 The Philadelphia Flyers' second-round pick went to the Hartford Whalers as the result of a trade on July 3, 1981 that sent Ray Allison, Fred Arthur, Hartford's first-round and third-round in 1982 NHL Entry Draft to Philadelphia in exchange for Don Gillen, Rick MacLeish, Fred Arthur, Philadelphia's first-round and third-round in 1982 NHL Entry Draft with this pick.
 The Buffalo Sabres' second-round pick went to the Calgary Flames as the result of a trade on June 8, 1982 that sent Calgary's first-round and second-round picks in 1982 NHL Entry Draft, second-round pick in 1983 NHL Entry Draft along with Buffalo's option to swap first-round picks in 1983 NHL Entry Draft to Buffalo in exchange for Richie Dunn, Don Edwards and this pick. 
 The Minnesota North Stars' second-round pick went to the Pittsburgh Penguins as the result of a trade on March 2, 1982 that sent Mark Johnson to Minnesota in exchange for this pick.

Round three

 The Hartford Whalers' third-round pick went to the Philadelphia Flyers as the result of a trade on July 3, 1981 that sent Don Gillen, Rick MacLeish, Fred Arthur, Philadelphia's first-round, second-round and third-round in 1982 NHL Entry Draft to Hartford in exchange for Ray Allison, Fred Arthur, Hartford's first-round in 1982 NHL Entry Draft and this pick.
 The Washington Capitals' third-round pick went to the Philadelphia Flyers as the result of a trade on August 21, 1980 that sent Bob Kelly to Washington in exchange for this pick.
 The Winnipeg Jets' third-round pick went to the New Jersey Devils as the result of a trade on July 15, 1981 that sent Lucien DeBlois to Winnipeg in exchange for Brent Ashton and this pick.
 The Philadelphia Flyers' third-round pick went to the Hartford Whalers as the result of a trade on July 3, 1981 that sent Ray Allison, Fred Arthur, Hartford's first-round and third-round in 1982 NHL Entry Draft to Philadelphia in exchange for Don Gillen, Rick MacLeish, Fred Arthur, Philadelphia's first-round and second-round in 1982 NHL Entry Draft with this pick.
 The Buffalo Sabres' third-round pick went to the Washington Capitals as the result of a trade on June 9, 1982 that sent Washington's second-round and fourth-round picks in 1982 NHL Entry Draft to Buffalo in exchange for Alan Haworth and this pick.
 The Minnesota North Stars' third-round pick was re-acquired on draft day to complete a trade on February 2, 1981 that sent Gary Edwards to Edmonton in exchange for future considerations.
 Edmonton previously acquired this pick as the result of a trade on August 21, 1981 that sent rights to Don Murdoch to Minnesota in exchange for Don Jackson and this pick.

Round four

 The New Jersey Devils' fourth-round pick went to the Los Angeles Kings as the result of a trade on November 18, 1978 that sent Nick Beverley to Colorado in exchange for this pick. The Colorado Rockies relocated to New Jersey to become the Devils for the 1982–83 NHL season.
 The Detroit Red Wings' fourth-round pick went to the Calgary Flames as the result of a trade on November 10, 1981 that sent Eric Vail to Detroit in exchange for Gary McAdam and this pick.
 The Toronto Maple Leafs' fourth-round pick went to the Detroit Red Wings as the result of a trade on March 8, 1982 that sent Jim Korn to Toronto in exchange for Toronto's 5th-rd pick in 1983 NHL Entry Draft and this pick.
 The Washington Capitals' fourth-round pick went to the Buffalo Sabres as the result of a trade on June 9, 1982 that sent Alan Haworth and Buffalo's third-round pick in 1982 NHL Entry Draft to Washington in exchange for Washington's second-round picks in 1982 NHL Entry Draft and this pick.
 The Los Angeles Kings' fourth-round pick went to the Montreal Canadiens as the result of a trade on September 14, 1979 that sent Brad Selwood and Montreal's fourth-round pick in 1982 NHL Entry Draft to Los Angeles in exchange for this pick.
 The St. Louis Blues' fourth-round pick went to the Vancouver Canucks as the result of a trade on March 9, 1982 that sent Glen Hanlon to St. Louis in exchange for Tony Currie, Rick Heinz, Jim Nill and this pick.
 The Pittsburgh Penguins' fourth-round pick went to the Toronto Maple Leafs as the result of a trade on September 11, 1981 that sent Paul Harrison in exchange for this pick.
 The Vancouver Canucks' fourth-round pick went to the Winnipeg Jets as the result of a trade on July 15, 1981 that sent the rights to Ivan Hlinka to Vancouver in exchange for Brent Ashton and this pick.
 The Calgary Flames' fourth-round pick went to the Minnesota North Stars as the result of a trade on June 7, 1982 that sent Steve Christoff, Bill Nyrop and Minnesota's second-round pick in 1982 NHL Entry Draft to Calgary in exchange for Willi Plett and this pick.
 Calgary (Atlanta) previously acquired this pick as the result of a trade on October 23, 1979 that sent Bobby Lalonde to Boston in exchange for this pick.
 The Montreal Canadiens' fourth-round pick went to the Los Angeles Kings as the result of a trade on September 14, 1979 that sent Los Angeles' fourth-round pick in 1982 NHL Entry Draft to Montreal in exchange for Brad Selwood and this pick.

Round five

 The Vancouver Canucks' fifth-round pick went to the Los Angeles Kings as the result of a trade on March 8, 1981 that sent Doug Halward to Vancouver in exchange for future considerations (Gary Bromley) and this pick.
 The New York Rangers' fifth-round pick went to the Toronto Maple Leafs as the result of a trade on October 16, 1981 that sent Pat Hickey to the Rangers in exchange for this pick.

Round six

 The Los Angeles Kings' sixth-round pick went to the Buffalo Sabres as the result of a trade on March 10, 1981 that sent Don Luce to Los Angeles in exchange for cash and this pick.
 The Pittsburgh Penguins' sixth-round pick went to the Toronto Maple Leafs as the result of a trade on February 3, 1982 that sent Greg Hotham to Pittsburgh in exchange for Pittsburgh's 5th-rd pick in 1983 NHL Entry Draft and future considerations (this pick).
 The Winnipeg Jets' sixth-round pick went to the Montreal Canadiens as the result of a compensation trade on December 19, 1981 for signing Serge Savard to Winnipeg in exchange this pick.  Savard retired from the NHL on August 12, 1981.  The Jets selected him in the NHL waiver draft on October 5, 1981.  The trade was completed upon Savard's return to the NHL with the Jets.
 The Washington Capitals' sixth-round pick went to the Calgary Flames as the result of a trade on June 9, 1982 that sent Ken Houston and Pat Riggin to Washington in exchange for Howard Walker, George White, Washington's third-round pick in 1983 NHL Entry Draft, second-round pick in 1984 NHL Entry Draft and this pick.
 Washington previously acquired this pick as the result of a trade on February 1, 1982 that sent Tim Tookey and seventh-round pick in 1982 NHL Entry Draft to Quebec in exchange for Lee Norwood and this pick.

Round seven
Victor Nechaev, the first Russian trained player to play professionally in the NHL was selected by the Los Angeles Kings in the seventh round of the 1982 Draft.

 The Washington Capitals' seventh-round pick went to the Quebec Nordiques as the result of a trade on February 1, 1982 that sent Lee Norwood and Quebec's sixth-round pick in 1982 NHL Entry Draft to Washington in exchange for Tim Tookey and this pick.
 The Quebec Nordiques' seventh-round pick went to the Toronto Maple Leafs as the result of a trade on March 9, 1982 that sent Wilf Paiement to Quebec in exchange for Miroslav Frycer and this pick.

Round eight

 The Quebec Nordiques' eight-round pick went to the New York Rangers as the result of a trade on December 30, 1981 that sent Jere Gillis and Dean Talafous to Quebec in exchange for Robbie Ftorek and this pick.  Dean Talafous did not report to Quebec and retired from hockey.  Pat Hickey was substituted to complete the trade after an arbitrator's decision on March 8, 1982.

Round nine

Round ten

 The Hartford Whalers' tenth-round pick went to the New York Rangers as the result of a trade on October 2, 1981 that sent Chris Kotsopoulos, Gerry McDonald and Doug Sulliman to Hartford in exchange for Mike Rogers and this pick. 
 The Boston Bruins' tenth-round pick went to the New Jersey Devils as the result of a trade on July 21, 1981 that sent Colorado's second-round pick in 1982 NHL Entry Draft and Boston's option to swap first-round picks in 1982 NHL Entry Draft to Boston in exchange for the rights to Dwight Foster and this pick.  The Colorado Rockies relocated to New Jersey to become the Devils for the 1982-83 NHL season.

Round eleven

Round twelve

 The Buffalo Sabres' twelfth-round pick went to the Washington Capitals as the result of a trade on June 9, 1982 that sent Washington's 12th-rd pick in 1983 NHL Entry Draft to Buffalo in exchange for this pick. 
 The Minnesota North Stars' twelfth-round pick went to the Quebec Nordiques as the result of a trade on June 9, 1982 that sent Quebec's 11th-rd pick in 1983 NHL Entry Draft to Minnesota in exchange for this pick.

Draftees based on nationality

See also
 1982–83 NHL season
 List of NHL players

References

External links
 HockeyDraftCentral.com
 1982 NHL Draft list and stats at Hockey-Reference
 1982 NHL Entry Draft player stats at The Internet Hockey Database

Draft
National Hockey League Entry Draft